Constantin Wladimir Rozanoff, also known as Kostia Rozanoff, (23 August 1905 – 3 April 1954 was a French test pilot, a colonel of the French Air Force, and one of the pioneers of jet aviation. He was the chief test pilot at Dassault Aviation. He flew 201 types of planes and helicopters while logging 5,000 flying hours, including 3,865 combat hours. He also broke the sound barrier 104 times.

Early life 

Constantin Rozanoff was born to a Russian family in Warsaw. He and his mother emigrated to France in 1917 because of the Russian Revolution and, in 1927, obtained French citizenship. Rozanoff entered the engineering school École Centrale Paris, where he graduated in 1928. Called into military service the same year, he completed his service with the 34th Aviation Regiment of observation at Le Bourget as a reserve officer in the commune of Avord.

He attended the SUPAERO National Aircraft School (L'École nationale supérieure de l'aéronautique et de l'espace) in 1933, and after completing studies he became a licensed pilot. In 1935 he became a pilot with the Center of Aeronautics in Villacoublay (Centre d'Essais des Matériels Aéronautiques - CEMA) and took part in flight testing of the Morane-Saulnier MS.406, Dewoitine D.520 and Bloch MB.152. In October 1937, Rozanoff was almost killed when losing control of a Hanriot while testing its spin characteristics. He could not recover the plane from its spin in time to avoid a crash, but he ejected from the aircraft successfully.

War Service 

In February 1940 Rozanoff became second in command of Groupe de chasse GC II/4 and flew operations in the Battle of France. In May 1940 he shot down two Luftwaffe fighter planes while flying a Curtiss P-36.After the Nazi occupation of France began in 1942, he travelled to Morocco where he participated in operations with the Allies in Tunis and Algeria, and on convoy operations over the Mediterranean flying the Curtiss P-40 (with onboard sign «MadKot»). He commanded GC 2/5 («Lafayette») and GC 2/3 («Dauphiné»).

In December 1943 Rozanoff immigrated to Great Britain where he was promoted to lieutenant colonel and attended additional test pilot courses, including one at the Central Flying School. During this time, Rozanoff flew the first Royal Air Force jet, the Gloster G-41, and participated in testing the P-59 Airacomet and Lockheed P-80 Shooting Star in the United States.

Postwar 
In December 1945, Rozanoff returned from the US as a Colonel. He served at Airbase 118 in Mont-de-Marsan, which was later named after him.

He was demobilised in October 1946 and headed the Test Division of the Dassault Aviation (as chief pilot). Colonel Rozanoff became the chief test pilot flying the MD-450 Ouragan and participated in testing military transport planes such as the Dassault MD.315 Flamant, and the fighter-bomber Mystère (I-IV).

Rozanoff became the first Frenchman to break the sound barrier in level flight, on 24 February 1954, with the Mystère IV B.

In 1954 Constantin Rozanoff published his autobiographical- Double Bang - Ma Vie de Pilote d'Essai.

Colonel Rozanoff was killed in a crash of a Mystère IV B during a public low-level flight over the Melun Villaroche Aerodrome.

He was buried in the Passy Cemetery.

He was awarded the Air Medal and the cross of the Légion d'honneur.

References

External links
 Groupe de Chasse II/4
 Historique de la Base aérienne 118 de Mont de Marsan
  Constantin Rozanoff, «Kostia», pilote de chasse - Aerostories
 Rozanoff Constantin, «Kostia» - Ciel De Gloire

1905 births
1954 deaths
French aviators
French test pilots
French World War II flying aces
French World War II pilots
Aviators killed in aviation accidents or incidents in France
Emigrants from the Russian Empire to France
Naturalized citizens of France
Polish emigrants to France
People from Warsaw Governorate
Burials at Passy Cemetery